The 1976 Asian Invitational Badminton Championships which was the first edition of Asian Invitational Championships  took place in the month of March in Bangkok, Thailand. The individual competitions except Mixed doubles were conducted. At the end of day, Indonesia took titles from two disciplines, Men's singles and Men's doubles competitions while China won Women's singles and Malaysia secured Women's doubles title.

Medalists

Men's singles

Women's singles

Men's doubles

Women's doubles

References 

 
Badminton Asia Championships
Asian Badminton Championships
1976 Badminton Asia Championships
Badminton Asia Championships
Badminton Asia Championships